The Pioneer State Bank No. 36 is a bank building located at 4046 Huron Street (M-90) in the village of North Branch in North Branch Township in northern Lapeer County, Michigan.  The bank stands as the oldest bank institution in North Branch.   It was designated as a Michigan State Historic Site on October 23, 1979 and later added to the National Register of Historic Places on April 22, 1982.

History
Pioneer State Bank was founded in 1885. In 1889, by Frederick C. Ballard, a prominent local investor and financier, helped reorganize the bank.  In 1902, Ballard's son Charles commissioned  architects Dillon Clark and Alverton Munger of Bay City to design this building. In 1903 he purchased the present site for the new building, and construction was completed in 1906. The structure continues to operate as an independent bank.

Description
The Pioneer State Bank building is a simple, rectangular, two-story brick building in the style of Renaissance Revival architecture.  It measures 24 feet by 79 feet. The main facade has a classically-inspired first floor door enframement, flanked by pilasters and capped by a pediment. A single large window is to one side. Three one-over-one double hung windows with limestone lintels are arranged symmetrically on the second floor. Brick quoins decorate the corner, and limestone beltcourses at the first and second story levels, and the brick cornice line, continue around from the front to first bay of the side facade. The remaining five bays are simpler in design.

References

Bank buildings on the National Register of Historic Places in Michigan
Michigan State Historic Sites
Buildings and structures in Lapeer County, Michigan
Banks established in 1885
Commercial buildings completed in 1906
Renaissance Revival architecture in Michigan
1885 establishments in Michigan
National Register of Historic Places in Lapeer County, Michigan